Braga is a surname that can be found in Portuguese, Galician, and Italian language. Notable people with the name include:

 Abel Braga (born 1952), Brazilian football manager and player
 Aguinaldo Braga (born 1974), Brazilian-Macedonian football player
 Alice Braga (born 1983), Brazilian actress
 Antônio Francisco Braga (1868–1945), Brazilian music composer
 Antonio Luiz Braga, Brazilian chemist and professor 
 Brannon Braga (born 1965), American television producer and screenwriter
 Bruno Manuel Araújo Braga (born 1983), Portuguese footballer
 Carlo Braga (1889–1971), Filipino priest 
 Carlos Alberto Ferreira Braga (1907–2006), Brazilian songwriter
 Cícero Braga (born 1958), Brazilian chess master
 Eduardo Braga (born 1960), Brazilian politician and businessman
 Erasmo de Carvalho Braga (1877–1932), Brazilian Protestant evangelical leader.
 Ernani Braga (1888–1948), Brazilian music composer
 Fábio Braga (born 1992), Portuguese footballer
 Fernando Braga (born 1958), Argentine and Italian chess master
 Gaetano Braga (1829–1907), Italian composer and cellist
 Inês Braga (born 1984), Portuguese female water polo player
 Joly Braga Santos (1924–1988), Portuguese composer and conductor
Marcia Andrade Braga, Brazilian military officer and peacekeeper
 Márcio Braga (born 1936), Brazilian football president
 Oscar Lino Lopes Fernandes Braga (1931-2020), Angolan Roman Catholic bishop
 Regina Braga (born 1946), Brazilian actress
 Roberto Carlos Braga (born 1941), Brazilian singer
 Rubem Braga (1913–1990), Brazilian writer of short stories
 Sônia Braga (born 1950), Brazilian actress
 Teófilo Braga (1843–1924), Portuguese politician, writer and playwright
 Vladimir Braga (fl. 2005–2009), Moldovan politician

References 

Portuguese-language surnames
Galician-language surnames
Italian-language surnames